A constitutional referendum was held in Peru on 31 October 1993. It followed the Alberto Fujimori's presidential coup on 5 April 1992. A new constitution was published on 4 September 1993, limiting the President to two terms of five years, creating a unicameral Congress. Constitutional amendments would be possible with either a referendum or a two-thirds majority in two successive Congresses. Referendums would also be possible if a petition had 0.3% of voters' signatures. After being approved by 52% of voters, the new constitution came into force on 29 December 1993.

Results

References

1993 in Peru
1993 referendums
Referendums in Peru
Constitutional referendums
October 1993 events in South America